Muchas gracias de nada is the sixth album by Les Luthiers, recorded live in the Teatro Coliseo. It was released in October 1980.

Track listing

Side one
 "El rey enamorado"
 "La tanda"
 "Consejos para padres"
 "La gallina dijo eureka"

Side two
 "Cartas de color"

Les Luthiers albums
1980 live albums
1980s comedy albums
Live comedy albums
Live albums recorded in Buenos Aires